Al-Jāmiʿah al-Islāmiyyah ʿAzīz al-ʿUlūm Bābūnagar, better known simply as Babunagar Madrasah, is one of the well-known Qawmi madrasahs in Chittagong. Established in 1924, situated at Babunagar, Fatikchhari, there are at present about 3000 students acquiring education.

Education pattern
Al-Jamiatul Islamiah Azizul Uloom Babunagar being one of the oldest Jamiahs in Bangladesh offers the students Islamic education from the very initial stage up to the highest level. It also offers Specialization (Equivalent to Phd) in different subjects to the students who has successfully completed Takmil (MA).

Notable alumni
 Allama Junaid Babunagari 
 Abdus Salam Chatgami

Notable faculty
Sultan Ahmad Nanupuri

References

External links 
 Darul Ulooms, Jamiyas and Qaumi Madrasahs Worldwide 

Qawmi madrasas of Bangladesh
Deobandi Islamic universities and colleges
Islamic universities and colleges in Bangladesh
1924 establishments in India
Fatikchhari Upazila
Al-Jamiatul Islamiah Azizul Uloom Babunagar